Michael Lyons may refer to:
Michael J Lyons 2006 
 Michael Lyons (BBC chairman) (born 1949), Chairman of the British Broadcasting Corporation
 Michael Lyons (politician) (1910–1991), senator from County Mayo, Ireland
 Michael Lyons (sculptor) (1943-2019), British sculptor
 Mick Lyons (English footballer) (born 1951), English footballer and manager
 Mick Lyons (Gaelic footballer), former Meath Gaelic footballer